Yuito Moriwaki (森脇唯人, born 8 August 1996) is a Japanese boxer. He competed in the men's middleweight event at the 2020 Summer Olympics.

References

External links
 

1996 births
Living people
Japanese male boxers
Olympic boxers of Japan
Boxers at the 2020 Summer Olympics
Sportspeople from Tokyo
Asian Games competitors for Japan
Boxers at the 2018 Asian Games
21st-century Japanese people